The Eminence is an historic estate house located on a 5.6 acre riverfront parcel at 122 Islington Road in the village of Auburndale in Newton, Massachusetts. Built in 1853, it was designed by noted Boston architect Hammatt Billings in the Italian Villa style of architecture, and is one of two surviving high-style Italianate estate houses in the Auburndale area.  It was purchased, in unfinished state, by Thomas Hall, a magnetic instrument maker, in 1853.

On September 4, 1986, it was added to the National Register of Historic Places.

See also
 National Register of Historic Places listings in Newton, Massachusetts

References

National Register of Historic Places in Newton, Massachusetts
Houses on the National Register of Historic Places in Massachusetts
Houses completed in 1853
Houses in Newton, Massachusetts